is a Japanese film director.

Filmography

Film
Heavenly Forest (2006)
I Give My First Love to You (2009)
Paradise Kiss (2011)
Kiyoku Yawaku (2013)
Your Lie in April (2016)
Daytime Shooting Star (2017)
Kiss Me at the Stroke of Midnight (2019)
And Yet, You Are So Sweet (2023)

TV series
Iguana Girl (1996)
Minami-kun no Koibito (2004)

References

External links

Living people
Japanese film directors
Japanese television directors 
Year of birth missing (living people)